Calcaterra is an Italian surname. Notable people with the surname include:

Alessandro Calcaterra (born 1975), Italian water polo player
Fabio Calcaterra (born 1965), Italian footballer and manager
Fernando Calcaterra (born 1972), Argentine footballer
Giorgio Calcaterra (born 1972), Italian ultramarathoner
Giuseppe Calcaterra (born 1964), Italian cyclist
Herbert A. Calcaterra (1920–1942), United States Navy sailor
Horacio Calcaterra (born 1989), Argentine footballer
Roberto Calcaterra (born 1972), Italian water polo player
Washington Calcaterra (born 1950), Uruguayan footballer

See also
USS Calcaterra (DE-390), Edsall-class destroyer escort of the United States Navy

Italian-language surnames